Turbottoplectron is a genus of cave wētā in the family Rhaphidophoridae, endemic to New Zealand.

Cook et al (2010) found that Gymnoplectron and Turbottoplectron are synonymised with Pachyrhamma.

Species 
 Turbottoplectron cavernae (Hutton, 1897)
 Turbottoplectron unicolor Salmon, 1948

References 

Ensifera genera
Cave weta